Vernon Keith Scott II (born September 11, 1997) is an American football free safety for the Green Bay Packers of the National Football League (NFL). He played college football at TCU.

College career
Scott played college football at TCU coming out of Mansfield Summit High School. He saw playing time in 11 games as a freshman. As a sophomore, Scott mainly played special teams. During his junior season in 2018, he made one interception in the Cheez-It Bowl. As a senior in 2019, he started 10 games and ranked fourth on his team with 44 tackles while also forcing two fumbles. Scott made seven pass breakups and had a 98-yard interception return for a touchdown against Oklahoma.

Professional career

Scott was selected in the seventh round with the 236th overall pick in the 2020 NFL Draft by the Green Bay Packers. He was signed on June 1, 2020.

In Week 2 of the 2020 season against the Detroit Lions, Scott recorded his first career sack on Matthew Stafford during the 42–21 win.

On August 23, 2022, Scott was waived/injured and placed on injured reserve.

NFL career statistics

Regular season

Postseason

References

External links
Green Bay Packers bio
TCU Horned Frogs bio

Living people
Green Bay Packers players
American football safeties
TCU Horned Frogs football players
Players of American football from Dallas
Sportspeople from the Dallas–Fort Worth metroplex
1997 births